The following lists events that happened during 2000 in North Korea.

Incumbents
Premier: Hong Song-nam
Supreme Leader: Kim Jong-il

Events
June 13 to June 15: 2000 inter-Korean summit in Pyongyang

June 15: June 15th North–South Joint Declaration

August: Typhoon Prapiroon

September: Typhoon Saomai

See also
Years in South Korea

References

 
North Korea
Years of the 20th century in North Korea
North Korea
2000s in North Korea